Wang Thong is a sub-district in the Wang Thong District of Phitsanulok Province, Thailand.

Geography
The Bueng Rachanok Swamp is a popular tourist destination in the Wang Thong Sub-district. The Wang Thong River flows through Wang Thong. The sub-district lies in the Nan Basin, which is part of the Chao Phraya Watershed.

History
Originally named Talat Chum, it was renamed Wang Thong in 1939.

Administration
The sub-district is divided into 15 smaller divisions called (muban), which roughly correspond to the villages. There are 15 villages, each of which occupies one muban. Wang Thong is administered by a tambon administrative organization (TAO).  The muban in Wang Thong are enumerated as follows:

Infrastructure

Temples
The following is a list of Buddhist temples in the Wang Thong Sub-district:
วัดวังทองวราราม in Ban Wang Thong
วัดบางสะพาน in muban Ban Bang Saphan
วัดศรีโสภณ in Ban Suea Lak Hang
วัดพระพุทธบาทเขาสมอแคลง in Ban Kao Samo Khlaeng
วัดราชคีรีหิรัญยาราม in Ban Kao Samo Khlaeng
วัดวังพรม in Ban Wang Phrom
Wat Bueng Rachanok in Ban Bueng Rachanok
วัดคลองเรือ in Ban Rong Bom
วัดวชิรธรรมาวาส (ธ) in Ban Kao Samo Khlaeng
วัดมงคลนิมิต in Ban Than Prong

Radio
There is one radio station broadcast from Wang Thong, the Sathaanii Witthayu Ratthasaphaa (Parliament Radio Station). The frequency is 92.25 FM.

References

Tambon of Phitsanulok province
Populated places in Phitsanulok province